Hafta Bandh (Week off) is a 1991 action film directed and produced by Harish Bhosle and produced by Deepak Balraj Vij. It stars Jackie Shroff, Aditya Pancholi, Varsha Usgaonkar, Ekta Sohini and Sadashiv Amrapurkar.

Plot 
This is the story of conflict between honest cop Bajrang Tiwari and extortionist Firangi Paisewala. Firangi's goons extorts Hafta (weekly money) from poor businessmen and local corrupt cops help them. Fearless inspector Bajrang kills the goon leader Kartoos in an encounter. Thereafter fight starts between Bajrang and Firangi Paisewala.

Cast
 Jackie Shroff as Inspector Bajrang Tiwari
 Aditya Pancholi as Iqbal
 Varsha Usgaonkar as Maria
 Ekta Sohini as Rubina
 Sadashiv Amrapurkar as Firangi Paisewala
 Charan Raj as Inspector Rokade
 Anand Balraj as Madan Chikna
 Balbinder Dhami as John

Soundtrack
Lyrics: Javed Akhtar

References

External links
 

1991 films
1990s Hindi-language films
Films scored by Bappi Lahiri
Indian action drama films